Ovaginella is a genus of marginellid  minute sea snails, marine gastropod mollusks in the subfamily Austroginellinae of the family Marginellidae, the margin snails.

Species
 † Ovaginella arenula Darragh, 2017 
 Ovaginella decaryi (Bavay, 1920)
 Ovaginella maoria (Powell, 1937)
 † Ovaginella mumiformis Darragh, 2017 
 Ovaginella ovulum (G. B. Sowerby II, 1846)
 Ovaginella profunda (Suter, 1909)
 Ovaginella tenisoni (Pritchard, 1900)
Synonyms
 Ovaginella cylichnella (May, 1918): synonym of Balanetta cylichnella (May, 1918)
 Ovaginella nielseni (Laseron, 1948): synonym of Cystiscus minutissimus (Tenison Woods, 1876)
 Ovaginella rotunda (Laseron, 1948): synonym of Ovaginella tenisoni (Pritchard, 1900)
 Ovaginella stiria (Cotton, 1949): synonym of Ovaginella tenisoni (Pritchard, 1900)
 Ovaginella whani (Pritchard & Gatliff, 1900): synonym of Balanetta baylii Jousseaume, 1875

References

 Bavay, A., 1920. Sables littoraux de Madagascar. Marginelles. Journal de Conchyliologie 65: 163-168
 Laseron, C. F. (1957). A new classification of the Australian Marginellidae (Mollusca), with a review of species from the Solanderian and Dampierian zoogeographical provinces. Australian Journal of Marine and Freshwater Research. 8 (3): 274-311.
 Cossignani T. (2006). Marginellidae & Cystiscidae of the World. L'Informatore Piceno. 408pp

External links

  Coovert, G. A.; Coovert, H. K. (1995). Revision of the supraspecific classification of marginelliform gastropods. The Nautilus. 109(2-3): 43-100

Marginellidae